Krishna Raja Sagara, also popularly known as KRS, is a lake and the dam that creates it. They are close to the settlement of Krishna Raja Sagara in the Indian State of Karnataka. The gravity dam made of surki mortar is below the confluence of river Kaveri with its tributaries Hemavati and Lakshmana Tirtha, in the district of Mandya.

Krishna Raja Wadiyar IV Maharaj of Mysore constructed the dam during the famine despite the critical financial condition in State. It was after him that the dam was named.
There is an ornamental garden, Brindavan Gardens, attached to the dam.

Background
The region of Mysore and especially Mandya had historically been dry and had witnessed mass migration to adjoining areas in the hot summers. A severe drought in 1875–76 partly due to the British Government in India had wiped out one-fifth of the population of the Kingdom of Mysore. Crop failures were common due to lack of water for irrigation. The Kaveri river was seen as a potential source of irrigation water for the farmers in and around Mysore in the erstwhile Kingdom of Mysore.

Survey and plan
The Chief Engineer of Mysore, faced opposition from the finance ministry of the government of Mysore, who said the project would "serve no purpose" and that the electricity produced from it would not be of complete use due to lack in demand. He then approached T. Ananda Rao, the Diwan of Mysore and the Maharaja Krishna Raja Wadiyar IV for a reconsideration. Upon examining, the latter gave his consent issuing an order on 11 October 1911 to begin the project and a sum of 81 lakh was set aside for it. Madras Presidency then opposed the project and urged the imperial government to not approve it. Upon Visvesvaraya's persuasion, the government consented. However, the initial plan to build a dam 194-feet high to hold an estimated  of water had to be dropped.

Construction
Construction began in November 1911, and 10,000 workers were employed. A mortar known as surki was used in place of cement, as the latter was not manufactured in India at the time and importing would prove costly for the state. By the time construction completed in 1931, around 5,000 to 10,000 persons had lost their homes to the project. However, they were rehabilitated and provided with agricultural land in the adjacent areas by the government.

Operation
In place of spillways that prevents over-topping of dams, Visvesvaraya employed 48 automatic gates that open and close at the rise and fall of water in the reservoir, in six sets, with eight in each. Each gate consists of a sill, lintel, and side grooves and plates; balance weight; float; chains and pulleys; and inlet and outlet pipes. The gates are made of cast iron and were manufactured at the Visvesvaraya Iron and Steel Plant in Bhadravati.

The eight sets of gates are connected by means of chains and pulleys to a dead weight, which in turn is connected to a float, making up the 'balance weight' together, working inside a masonry well, both on the rear of the dam.  The deadweight and float are placed one behind the other so as to have four gates on each side of it. When all the eight gates close the sluice, the balance weight moves to the top of its swing and float to the bottom of the well. The well has an inlet pipe  in diameter from the reservoir that allows water in when the reservoir reaches maximum permissible level causing the float to rise, the balance weight to fall pulling the gates up allowing discharge of water. In the same mechanism, the well gets emptied through an exit pipe when the water level in the reservoir falls.

Dam
Foundation Stone to dam was laid on 11 November 1911. The dam was built across the river Kaveri in 1924. It is the main source of water for the districts of Mysore. The water is used for irrigation in Mysore and Mandya, and it is the main source of drinking water for all of Mysore, Mandya and almost the whole of Bengaluru city, the capital of Karnataka. The water released from this dam flows into the state of Tamil Nadu and is stored in Mettur dam in the Salem district.

Brindavan Gardens

The Brindavan Gardens is a show garden that has a botanical park, with fountains, as well as boat rides beneath the dam. Diwan Sir Mirza Ismail of Mysore planned and built the gardens in connection with the construction of the dam. KRS Dam was the first to install automated Crest gates during 1920, which was initiated by Sir. Erwin who was British chief engineer. Display items include a musical fountain. Various biological research departments are housed here.

Flora and fauna

The landscape of the area represents a complexity of agricultural land, rural habitation, sparingly spread trees and patches of original vegetation at the close by Ranganathittu Wildlife Sanctuary, which attracts wide varieties of local and migrant birds. Nearly 220 species of birds have been recorded here in large numbers.

See also

List of dams and reservoirs in India

References

External links

 Krishnarajasagara Reservoir Project at Karnataka Water Resources Department
Mysore Nature|KRS for birders

Kaveri River
Dams in Karnataka
Kingdom of Mysore
Hydroelectric power stations in Karnataka
Reservoirs in Karnataka
Dams on the Kaveri River
Buildings and structures in Mandya district
Tourist attractions in Mandya district
Geography of Mandya district
Dams completed in 1938
1938 establishments in India
20th-century architecture in India